Abderrahim Bouabid (in Arabic: عبد الرحيم بوعبيد –23; b. March 1922 in Salé – d. 8 January 1992 in Rabat) was a Moroccan politician, and head of the left-wing Socialist Union of Popular Forces (SUPF) between 1975 and 1992.

Early life
Bouabid was born in the Medina of Salé, on 23 March 1922. He studied primary school in his hometown, before attending high school in Rabat, at Moulay Youssef high school. During that time, he frequented a number of distinguished personalities who shaped the future of the country. A friend of Mehdi Ben Barka, the young Bouabid was introduced to the nationalist movement of the time, opposing the French presence in the country. In 1939, after graduating, he moved to Fez to become a teacher, meeting nationalist organizations.

Political Engagement
Involved in politics since his youth, Bouabid became one of the youngest activists and politicians to sign the Proclamation of Independence of Morocco, a manifesto presented by the Independence party on 11 January 1944 demanding full independence from France and Spain, national reunification, and a democratic constitution.

On 28 January 1944, Bouabid led a big demonstration in Salé denouncing the arrest of some influential figures of his party. He was jailed alongside a number of Istiqlal leaders before being released a year later. In 1946 he joined his friend Mehdi Ben Barka in France to write a report on the Moroccan situation and submit it to the United Nations. While living in France, he pursued his law studies at university and became a lawyer in 1949.

Once Morocco was granted independence, Bouabid was named State Minister for Negotiations under Mbarek Bekkay's government. In 1956, he became Ambassador of Morocco in Paris, and he was later appointed a Minister of National Economy. On 12 May 1958, he was in charge of the Ministry of National Economy and Agriculture in Ahmed Balafrej’s cabinet. He was Minister of Economy and Finance from December 1958 to May 1960.

References

External links

1922 births
1992 deaths
20th-century Moroccan lawyers
Finance ministers of Morocco
Moroccan politicians
Moroccan revolutionaries
Moroccan writers
National Union of Popular Forces politicians
People from Salé